E. Bruce Harrison (April 3, 1932 – January 16, 2021) was a public relations (PR) expert who organized several campaigns for the U.S. industry against environmental legislation from the 1970s to the 1990s. He has been called the father of environmental PR.

Harrison was born in Alabama. He started his career as a reporter at a local newspaper and the press secretary of an Alabama Democratic Senator. When Silent Spring attacked the indiscriminate use of pesticides, the chemical industry lobby hired Harrison to fight the new legislation as the very first "environmental information officer".

Harrison pioneered the use of economic analysis in opposing environmental action. He developed a messaging strategy which promoted the balance of "the three Es": Environment, Energy, and Economy. In the early 1990s, he conducted a comprehensive PR campaign for the Global Climate Coalition, an industrial lobby opposing action to reduce greenhouse gas emissions. In 1995 he wrote that the "GCC has successfully turned the tide on press coverage of global climate change science".

He managed his eponymous PR firm from 1973 until 1997, when he sold it. He co-founded it with his wife Patricia Harrison, an American public relations executive and government official.

Legacy
Media historian Melissa Aronczyk considered Harrison "a master at what he did". Al Gore, former US Vice President, described the GCC campaign as the worst moral crime since the world wars.

A sub-genus of mosquito was named Bruceharrisonius in 2003.

References

Climate change in the United States
American public relations people
1932 births
2021 deaths